Mesotes is a genus of snakes of the family Colubridae.

Geographic range
All species in the genus Mesotes are endemic to South America.

Species
The following 2 species are recognized as being valid.
 Mesotes rutilus Prado, 1942 - Prado's coastal house snake
 Mesotes strigatus (Günther, 1858) -coastal house snake  

Nota bene: A binomial authority in parentheses indicates that the species was originally described in a genus other than Mesotes.

References

Mesotes
Snake genera
Taxa named by Giorgio Jan